Beaulieu College is a private, English medium and co-educational secondary school situated in  Kyalami, Midrand in the Gauteng province of South Africa. The learners write Independent Examination Board (IEB) examinations. The school was established in 2000, and in 2012 merged with Beaulieu Preparatory School and Kyalami Preparatory School to form the Kyalami Schools Group.

History 
In 2012, Beaulieu College was merged with Beaulieu Preparatory School and Kyalami Preparatory School to form a single non-profit company Kyalami Schools NPC. While the three schools maintain separate identities, campuses and school management structures, several services have been centralised across the campuses.

Heads 
 Robert Clarence (2000 - June 2004)
 Vivienne Jones (Acting Head: July 2004 - December 2004)
 Andrew Cook (2005–2008)
 Danielle Meikle (Acting Head: January 2009 - May 2009; Head: June 2009–present)

Academics 
Beaulieu College school-leavers write the Independent Examinations Board's National Senior Certificate examinations.

External links 
 

Private schools in Gauteng
Educational institutions established in 2000
2000 establishments in South Africa